Great Yarmouth is a town in Norfolk, England.

Great Yarmouth may also refer to:

Relating to the town
 Great Yarmouth (UK Parliament constituency)
 Borough of Great Yarmouth,  local government district 
Great Yarmouth railway station
Great Yarmouth Town F.C., football club
Great Yarmouth High School
Great Yarmouth College
 Great Yarmouth Racecourse, a horse racing course

Other uses
 SS Great Yarmouth (1866), a freight ship built for the Great Eastern Railway

See also

Yarmouth (disambiguation)